was a Japanese politician, a member of the National Diet and a Cabinet member. He was a bureaucrat of Home Ministry, Economic Planning Agency, and Ministry of Transport before he became a politician.

Biography 
He was born in Taniyama (now part of Kagoshima City), Kagoshima Prefecture. In 1933, he finished Kagoshima Prefectural Daini-Kagoshima Middle School (now Kagoshima Prefectural Konan High School) in the fourth grade of five-year course to advance on to Seventh Higher School Zoshikan (now Kagoshima University). He graduated from Seventh Higher School Zoshikan in 1936 and from Department of Civil Engineering, Faculty of Engineering, Tokyo Imperial University (now University of Tokyo) in 1939. In the year of his university graduation, he entered the Civil Engineering Bureau of Home Ministry. He served as the Director-Generals of some bureaus of Ministry of Transport in the 1960's.

He was first elected to a member of the House of Representatives of the National Diet in 1972 and was elected 8 times. He  served as Director General of the Science and Technology Agency in the Cabinet of Noboru Takeshita from December 27, 1988 to June 2, 1989. He also served as the Chairs of the Committee on Judicial Affairs and the Committee on Communications of the House of Representatives.

References 

20th-century Japanese politicians
Government ministers of Japan
Members of the House of Representatives (Japan)
Liberal Democratic Party (Japan) politicians
Politicians from Kagoshima Prefecture
University of Tokyo alumni
Kagoshima University alumni
People from Kagoshima
1917 births
2004 deaths